Richard A. Forsgren (July 22, 1923 – April 8, 1998) was an American politician. He served as a Democratic member of the Wyoming House of Representatives.

Life and career 
Forsgren was born in Brigham City, Utah. He attended Box Elder High School and West Texas State University.

In 1963, Forsgren was elected to the Wyoming House of Representatives, representing Sweetwater County, Wyoming, serving until 1965.

Forsgren died in April 1998 at the Northwest Hospital in Tucson, Arizona, at the age of 74.

References 

1923 births
1998 deaths
People from Brigham City, Utah
Democratic Party members of the Wyoming House of Representatives
20th-century American politicians